The 1974 Race of Champions was a non-championship Formula One race held at Brands Hatch on 17 March 1974. The 40-lap race featured both Formula One and Formula 5000 cars, and was won by Belgian driver Jacky Ickx in a Lotus-Cosworth, with Austria's Niki Lauda second in a Ferrari and Brazil's Emerson Fittipaldi third in a McLaren-Cosworth.

Qualifying
Note: a blue background indicates a Formula 5000 entrant.

Classification
Note: a blue background indicates a Formula 5000 entrant.

References

Race of Champions (Brands Hatch)
Race of Champions
Formula 5000 race reports
Gold
Race of Champions